The 1931–32 Scottish Second Division was won by East Stirlingshire who, along with second placed St Johnstone, were promoted to the First Division. Edinburgh City finished bottom.

Table

References 

 Scottish Football Archive

Scottish Division Two seasons
2
Scot